The 1927 Wisconsin Badgers football team was an American football team that represented the University of Wisconsin in the 1927 Big Ten Conference football season. The team compiled a 4–4 record (1–4 against conference opponents), finished in a tie for last place in the Big Ten Conference, and outscored all opponents by a combined total of 96 to 75. Glenn Thistlethwaite was in his first year as Wisconsin's head coach.

Halfback Ed Crofoot was selected as the team's most valuable player, the team captain, and a first-team player on the 1927 All-Big Ten Conference football team. Other notable players included halfback Gene H. Rose, end Don Cameron, and tackle Stanley Binish.

The team played its home games at Camp Randall Stadium, which had a capacity of 38,293. During the 1927 season, the average attendance at home games was 18,512.

Schedule

References

Wisconsin
Wisconsin Badgers football seasons
Wisconsin Badgers football